Maria Voinovna Zubova (Russian: Мария Воиновна Зубова), (1749?–1799) was a Russian poet, composer, and concert singer, known for her rendition of folksongs.

She was born in Saint Petersburg and was the daughter of Vice-Admiral Warrior Yakovlevich Rimsky-Korsakov. She was married to Afanasy Nikolaevich Zubov (1738-1822), Governor of Kursk from 1782 to 1791. With her husband, on June 19, 1780, they moved into an estate located near Murom, Vladimir Oblast, regarded as one of the most ancient cities within Russia.

Composer 
Zubova was the creator of heartfelt poems and a composer of salon songs during the late 18th and was considered by the Russian Writer Daniil Mordovtsev as one of the "literary daughters of Lomonosov and Sumarokov."

Only a small portion of her musical work was published, the majority being published in Saint Petersburg during 1770. She was also a minor translator of French literature, although her work remains unpublished. She is most recognized for her folksong "I am moving to the desert..." written in 1791, whose words are now commonly used within the Russian vernacular. The second line of the first stanza is used, e.g., "From the beautiful places here," to denote a cynically tongue-in-cheek attitude of fake nostalgic sadness at one's departure from a less-than-satisfactory place of dwelling. Hence, they prefer the heat of the desert over the inferior conditions of the present. The date attributed to the song is disputed, as many of her songs were printed 10 years earlier in an anthology published by the duo M. D Chulkov and N. I Novikov. The song is present within several different anthologies, the most recent being the Soviet collection of songs called "Monuments of Russian Musical Art" as collected by the Soviet Musicologist Yuri V. Keldysh in 1979. It was presented by Keldysh in the Classical style, unadorned and with no given bass accompaniment, only figured bass.

Zubova's songs featured her own poetic verse and was heavily influenced by pre-Revolutionary expansionism as a result of Peter's 1st Petrian reforms and further intellectual cultivations under Catherine The Great during the Russian Enlightenment. Because she was mostly active during the latter half of the 18th-century, themes used in her romances and folksongs dealt with expressing the naturality of life and the realistic experiences of the folk people, all the while maintaining sophisticated objectivity. Because of this, she won much support from Russian society and her career was immensely fruitful throughout Russia's societal hierarchy.

Mordovtsev notes that Zubova's songs were "the first" compositions that were emotionally able to be sung due to Russia's demoralized and socioculturally bruised position as a result of the mid/late 17th century Raskol movement, a religious Schism led by Patriarch Nikon to centralize the Russian Orthodox faith and its practices, as well as consolidate the chain of command, leading to widespread persecution against the "Old Believers."

Performance career 
Along with her compositional career, she was widely known for being a highly skilled folk-song performer, often performing at parties and salons to high praise. The Russian folklorist Mikhail Nikolaevich Makarov (1785-1847) said she was, "the best singer in the early reign of Catherine II." Her musical talent was steeped in the Italian style and participated in the 18th-century convention of ornamentation and melodic improvisation while performing, as per the custom during the Baroque period. This style was known as "figured singing," with the focus on dexterous movement and emotional fervanices all the while retaining a cool demeanor and composed vibrancy a quintessentiality of Zubova's singing style.

Personality and death 
Natalia Kirillovna Zagryazhskaya (1747-1837), a lady in waiting to Catherine II and close acquaintance of Pushkin, called Zubova "an intelligent and amiable woman", akin to the behavioral style of "Monsieur Morte," the Marquise de Merteuil and hero of the novel Les Liaisons dangereuses by Choderlos de Laclos.

On October 9, 1799, Count Fyodor Vasilievich Rostopchin (1763-1826) and Count Semyon Vorontsov (1744-1832) notified Zubova's relatives that she had suddenly died after suffering a stroke during a card game with friends.

Compositions

Songs 

 1791: I am moving away from the beautiful local places into the desert, for piano and voice

Anthologies 

 1770: Collection of Various Songs (Собрание разных песен:(Second version,1788), by M. D Chulkov and N. I Novikov 
 1827: Newest Selected Songbook
1979: Monuments of Russian musical art. Issue 1: Russian vocal lyrics of the 18th century, curated and published by Yuri. V. Keldysh

Cantatas 

 [They are said to have existed, but no more detail is provided]

Poem 

 According to Amanda Ewington, "Zubova's present obscurity belies the intense popularity once enjoyed by her poem 'I am Leaving for the Wilds.' This poem long attributed to Zubova, was a staple in Russian culture among all social classes."

Recordings 

 I am banished to the Desert: Ensemble Talisman, Oleg Timofeyev (Guitar), Anne Harley (Soprano) Dorian Recordings, Music of Russian Princesses (2013)
I am retiring to the Desert: M. Zhilkin (soprano), E. Mityushkina (mezzo-soprano), I. Malyshev (piano)

References

Further reading 

 Makarov M.N. women authors. - Ladies' magazine, 1830, h. 29, Љ 3.
 Mordovtsev DL Russian women of the second sex. XVIII century - SPb., 1874.
 Golitsyn Dictionary (1889).
 A list of persons of the Korsakov, Rimsky-Korsakov family and the Dundukov-Korsakov princes with brief biographical information. - SPb., 1893.
 Zubova, Maria Voinovna // Brockhaus and Efron Encyclopedic Dictionary: in 86 volumes (82 volumes and 4 additional). - SPb., 1894. - T. XIIa. - S. 703.
 Ewington, Amanda. “Maria Voinovna Zubova (1749?-1799).” Russian Women Poets of the Eighteenth and Early Nineteenth Centuries: A Bilingual Edition, translated by Amanda Ewington, Iter Inc., Toronto, CAN, 2014, pp. 319–325.

1749 births
1799 deaths
Russian women classical composers
Russian classical composers
18th-century classical composers
Russian nobility
18th-century musicians from the Russian Empire
18th-century women composers
18th-century poets
Musicians from Saint Petersburg